Lindsay Davenport was the defending champion but lost in the quarterfinals to Serena Williams.

Williams won in the final 4–6, 6–4, 6–2 against Kim Clijsters. This would be the final time Williams would attend the Indian Wells Masters until 2015, due to a boycott of the tournament by both Williams sisters. Venus Williams would not attend the Indian Wells Masters until 2016.

Seeds
A champion seed is indicated in bold text while text in italics indicates the round in which that seed was eliminated. All thirty-two seeds received a bye to the second round.

  Martina Hingis (semifinals)
  Lindsay Davenport (quarterfinals)
  Venus Williams (semifinals, withdrew)
  Monica Seles (second round)
  Conchita Martínez (second round)
  Mary Pierce (withdrew)
  Serena Williams (champion)
  Elena Dementieva (quarterfinals)
  Nathalie Tauziat (second round)
  Arantxa Sánchez-Vicario (third round)
  Anke Huber (fourth round)
  Magdalena Maleeva (fourth round)
  Sandrine Testud (third round)
  Kim Clijsters (final)
  Amy Frazier (second round)
  Barbara Schett (fourth round)
  Justine Henin (third round)
  Paola Suárez (third round)
  Tamarine Tanasugarn (third round)
  Lisa Raymond (fourth round)
  Meghann Shaughnessy (third round)
  Elena Likhovtseva (second round)
  Nathalie Dechy (fourth round)
  Magüi Serna (third round)
  Anne Kremer (third round)
  Gala León García (third round)
  Patty Schnyder (second round)
  Anne-Gaëlle Sidot (third round)
  Tatiana Panova (second round)
  Ai Sugiyama (fourth round)
  Silvia Farina Elia (quarterfinals)
  Cara Black (third round)
  Silvija Talaja (second round)

Draw

Finals

Top half

Section 1

Section 2

Section 3

Section 4

Bottom half

Section 5

Section 6

Section 7

Section 8

External links
 2001 Indian Wells Masters Draw (Archived 2009-07-22)

2001 Indian Wells Masters
Singles